AO-27 may refer to:

 AO-27 rifle
 USS Kaskaskia (AO-27)
 Eyesat-1, an amateur radio satellite also known as AO-27